Lanj Rud (also Romanized as Lanj Rūd and Lanjarūd; also known as Langarūd, Langerūd, Langrood, and Lanjrī) is a village in Pol-e Doab Rural District, Zalian District, Shazand County, Markazi Province, Iran. At the 2006 census, its population was 2,017, in 536 families.

References 

Populated places in Shazand County